Chengchong Town is an urban town under the administration of Liuyang City, Hunan Province, People's Republic of China. The town is bordered to the north by Jili Subdistrict, to the northeast by Hehua Subdistrict, to the south by Guanzhuang Town of Liling, to the west and southeast by Dayao Town, to the southwest by Puji Town, and to the northwest by Gejia Town.

History
The town was established in 1992.

In 1995, former Chengchong Town and Qingcao Township merged to form the new Chengchong Town.

Administrative divisions
The town is divided into seven villages and two communities: 
 Qingcao Community
 Chengchong Community
 Pingxi Village
 Caichang Village
 Heping Village
 Sanyuan Village
 Xinnanqiao Village
 Yajishan Village
 Jiahe Village

Geography
Liuyang River, also known as the mother river, flows through the town northeast to southwest.

Mountains located adjacent to and visible from the townsite are: Mount Guanggang and Mount Qiyajianxi.

Economy
Agriculture and fireworks play important roles in the local economy.

Education
 Chengchong Middle School

Transportation
The town is connected to two county roads: X008 and X016.

Notable people
 Tang Caichang (1867–1900), a late Qing reformer and political activist.
 Tang Caizhong (1873–1900), Tang Caichang's young brother, political activist.
 Li Shangwen (1868–1918), scholar.
 Yu Zhaochang (1867–1911), political activist.

References

External links

2000 Census information from 

Divisions of Liuyang
Liuyang